The Akha Expedition was a military expedition in India's north-east frontier in 1883–84.

References 

Military history of the United Kingdom
British India